James Corey may refer to:

Jim Corey, American actor
James S. A. Corey, pen name

See also
James Cory, Welsh politician and shipowner
James Corry (disambiguation)